"Take It Easy Chicken" (sometimes written "Take It Easy, Chicken") is a song by Chester rock band Mansun first released in 1995. It was the first song that the group ever recorded, and was later re-recorded and released as the lead track of the Two EP, the group's fourth release overall. An instrumental version appears in the PAL version of Gran Turismo 2.

Overview
The début single was only pressed to one thousand 7" vinyl copies in 1995, on the band's own garden shed label "Sci-Fi Hi-Fi Records". The spelling of the group's name was 'MANSON'.

Two EP was released on CD, Cassette and 7" Vinyl. Two EP peaked at #32 on the UK Singles Chart in June 1996.

In Japan three tracks from Two EP were compiled with the majority of the group's later release Three EP under the title Special Mini Album (Japan Only EP).

It was not included on the standard editions of the début album Attack of the Grey Lantern, US editions released by Epic records substituted the single "Stripper Vicar" for "Take It Easy Chicken". A music video for the song was directed by Walter Stern.

Paul Draper explained in the liner notes to Kleptomania that the song was recorded in a day along with four other songs in a self-financed session in "the cheapest studio we could find in the back of the Melody Maker". The track was pressed up to vinyl and sent out to radio stations. John Peel and Steve Lamacq played the song on BBC Radio 1 to Draper's surprise: "I couldn't believe it when I first heard them play the song, we'd never played a gig, could hardly play live and had no record deal". "Take It Easy Chicken" was the group's traditional closing song during live performances and was regularly extended, a nine-minute version recorded at Barrowlands, Glasgow was included as a b-side to "Negative" in 1998. A live version of "Drastic Sturgeon" included as a b-side to "She Makes My Nose Bleed" in 1997. An acoustic version of "Moronica" was featured on the "Wide Open Space" single in 1996.

Track listing

Personnel

Mansun
 Chad – Lead Guitar
 Paul Draper – Vocals, Guitar
 Hib – Drums
 Stove – Bass

Production
 Mike Hunter – Engineering ("Take It Easy Chicken", "Drastic Sturgeon", "Moronica")
 Ronnie Stone – Engineering ("Take It Easy Chicken", "Drastic Sturgeon", "Moronica")
 Clive Martin – Mixing ("Drastic Sturgeon", "The Greatest Pain", "Moronica"), Engineering ("The Greatest Pain")
 Mark 'Spike' Stent – Mixing ("Take It Easy Chicken" Re-recorded version)

Chart positions

References

1996 singles
Mansun songs
Songs written by Paul Draper (musician)
1996 songs